The Aberdeen School District ( Aberdeen 06-1) is a public school district which serves the southern portion of the city of Aberdeen, Brown County, South Dakota. Responsible for ten schools (including one alternative school), the district is administrated by a hired, full-time superintendent of schools, who reports directly to an elected school board.

School board 
The authority and powers of school boards and other officials within school districts in the state of South Dakota are derived directly from  chapter 138, despite their constituency being restricted to the district which they serve.  13839 elaborates that school boards hold "general charge, direction and management of the schools of the district and control and care of all property belonging to it". Resultantly, members of the board report directly to the public, and the state, and do not serve at the pleasure of other state or county authorities.  

As of February 2021, Aberdeen's school board consists of seven members elected from the community, one serving as president, and another as vice president.

Schools
As of February 2021, six elementary schools, two middle schools, one high school, and one alternative school are under the purview of the Aberdeen School District.

Defunct Schools
Aberdeen Alternative Middle School
Hub Area Technical School

References

External links
Aberdeen School District School districts in South Dakota